Breezing Home is a 1937 American drama film directed by Milton Carruth and starring Binnie Barnes, William Gargan, and Wendy Barrie.

Plot
A racehorse trainer, Steve Rowan, is forced to sell one of his favorites, Galaxy, to a crooked bookie, Joe Montgomery. With the gambler unable to get directly involved, Gloria Lee, who is Joe's girlfriend, acts as the horse's official new owner when Galaxy is entered in a race.

Steve is still the trainer, but quits after Joe fixes the race by bribing a jockey to disrupt Galaxy's race. Steve leaves for California, where wealthy stable owner Henrietta Fairfax hires him to train Memento, her own top thoroughbred.

Gloria's guilt results in her following Steve out west. She needs to borrow $1,000 to race Galaxy, but is banished from the track when officials discover that Joe gave her the money. Henrietta is in love with Steve but realizes he has feeling for Gloria, permitting him to train Galaxy on her behalf in an upcoming stakes race, which Galaxy wins.

Main cast

References

Bibliography

External links
 

1937 films
1930s sports drama films
American sports drama films
American black-and-white films
Universal Pictures films
American horse racing films
1937 drama films
Films directed by Milton Carruth
1930s English-language films
1930s American films